The House I Grew Up In is a BBC Radio series. The first episode of the first series was broadcast on 6 August 2007 on BBC Radio 4. With the presenter Wendy Robbins, each week an influential Briton explains some of their thoughts and memories as he or she goes back to the locality and the house (or houses) in which he or she was brought up. In July 2011, BBC Radio 4 began publishing a podcast featuring highlights of previous programmes, as well as the 2011 series.

Episodes

Series 1 (2007)
Four episodes:
 Peter Hennessy, 6 August
 Jacqueline Gold, 13 August
 Ian Paisley, Jr, 20 August
 Jackie Kay, 27 August

Series 2 (2008)
Six episodes:
 Sir Tom Farmer, 6 August
 Professor Mona Siddiqui, 13 August
 David Blunkett, 20 August
 Joanna Briscoe, 27 August
 Shaun Bailey, 3 September
 Baroness Warnock, 17 September

Series 3 (2009)
Five episodes:
 Baroness Campbell, 1 September
 Professor Steve Jones, 8 September
 Erin Pizzey, 15 September
 Kwame Kwei-Armah, 22 September
 Jonathan Aitken, 29 September

Series 4 (2010)
Six episodes:

 Peter Hitchens, 19 July
 Colin Blakemore, 26 July
 Julia Hobsbawm, 2 August
 Kay Mellor, 9 August
 Sir William Atkinson, 16 August
 Emma Harrison, 23 August

Series 5 (2011)
Four episodes:
 Shirley Williams, 4 August
 Terry Waite, 11 August
 Jasvinder Sanghera, 18 August
 Toby Young, 25 August

References

External links

BBC Radio 4 programmes